Lakshmibai College is a constituent college of the University of Delhi that provides higher education to women only. It is located in Ashok Vihar, Delhi, India. The college was established in 1965 and is named in honour of Rani Lakshmibai of Jhansi.

References

External links

Delhi University
Women's universities and colleges in Delhi
North West Delhi district
Educational institutions established in 1965
1965 establishments in Delhi